Vortiporius or Vortipor (Middle Welsh Gwrdeber or Gwerthefyr) was a king of Dyfed in the early to mid-6th century. He ruled over an area approximately corresponding to modern Pembrokeshire, Wales. Records from this era are scant, and virtually nothing is known of him or his kingdom. The only contemporary information about Vortiporius comes from the Welsh ecclesiastic Gildas, in a highly allegorical condemnation from his De Excidio et Conquestu Britanniae. At the time the work was written (c. 540), Gildas says that Vortiporius was king of Dyfed, that he was grey with age, that his wife had died, and that he had at least one daughter.

As a legendary king in Geoffrey of Monmouth's 12th-century treatment of the Matter of Britain, the Historia Regum Britanniae, Vortiporius was the successor of Aurelius Conanus and was succeeded by Malgo. He is not mentioned in the 9th-century Historia Brittonum attributed to Nennius. Vortiporius appears in the Irish genealogy given in the 8th-century work The Expulsion of the Déisi, in which his name is given as Gartbuir. The pedigree given in the Harley MS 5389, written c. 1100, is nearly identical, with his name given as Guortepir. In the Jesus College MS. 20, he is called Gwrdeber. The genealogy in Expulsion says he was a descendant of Eochaid Allmuir ( [literally (from) Overseas]), who is said to have led a sept of the Déisi in their settlement of Dyfed c. 270.

A memorial stone was discovered in 1895 near the church of Castell Dwyran in Carmarthenshire bearing a Christian cross and with inscriptions in both Latin and in ogham. Dedicated to Voteporigis in the Latin inscription and Votegorigas in ogham, it was immediately assumed that this referred to Vortiporius. However, this assumption is refuted by modern linguistic analysis, which notes that the missing 'r' in the first syllable of 'Voteporigis'/'Votegorigas' is significant, and so the stone must be dedicated to a different person.

Gildas

In his De Excidio et Conquestu Britanniae, written c. 540, Gildas makes an allegorical condemnation of 5 British kings by likening them to the beasts of the Christian Apocalypse as expressed in the biblical Book of Revelation, 13-2: the lion, leopard, bear, and dragon. In the course of his condemnations, Gildas makes passing reference to the other beasts mentioned in the Apocalypse, such as the eagle, serpent, calf, and wolf. Vortiporius is called "the spotted leopard" and the "tyrant of the Demetians", where Demetia is the ancient name of Dyfed.

Gildas restricts his attention to the kings of Gwynedd (Maelgwn Gwynedd), Dyfed (Vortiporius), Penllyn (probable, as its king Cuneglasus/Cynlas appears in royal genealogies associated with the region), Damnonia/Alt Clud (Constantine), and the unknown region associated with Caninus. These are all Welsh kingdoms except for Alt Clud, which had a long and ongoing relationship with Gwynedd and its kings.

The reason for Gildas' disaffection for these individuals is unknown. He was selective in his choice of kings, as he had no comments concerning the kings of the other British kingdoms that were thriving at the time, such as Rheged, Gododdin, Elmet, Pengwern/Powys, or the kingdoms of modern-day southern England. Gildas claims outrage over moral depravity, and begins the condemnation of the five kings with an attack against the mother of one of the kings, calling her an "unclean lioness".

Of Vortiporius Gildas says little other than offering condemnation for "sins" and providing the few personal details previously mentioned. He is alleged to be the bad son of a good father. Gildas also attacks his daughter, calling her "shameless", and implies that Vortiporius raped or had a sexual relationship with her.

Possible monument stone

A c. 5th-6th century monument bearing both Latin and Irish ogham inscriptions is known from Castell Dwyran, Carmarthenshire, Wales. Its Latin inscription reads Memoria Voteporigis Protictoris. The ogham inscription carries only the Goidelic form of his name in the genitive: Votecorigas. Protector (spelled here Protictoris, in the genitive) in the Latin inscription may imply a Roman-era honorific bestowed upon his ancestors, retained as a hereditary title into the 6th century. However, linguist Eric Hamp questions whether this is truly a title, suggesting that Protector may rather be a Latin translation of Uoteporix (which has essentially the same meaning as the Latin),  a "sort of onomastic explanatory gloss". The ogham inscription in Goidelic shows that the Irish language was still in use at that time, and had not yet died out in South Wales.

The stone's original location at the church is next to a meadow known locally as Parc yr Eglwys. Local tradition carries the admonition that plowing must not be done near the church. Examination of the meadow showed evidence of large hut-circles.

There remains a substantial question as to whether the stone refers to Vortiporius or to a similarly named individual, 'Voteporigis', as the 'r' in the first syllable would give the name different meaning. Rhys argued that the two individuals were the same person, saying that the 'r' had been added at a later date, and offering several suppositions as to how this might have happened.  However, he was working before the twentieth century advancements in the study of ancient Celtic languages, and his philological conclusions are suspect. More recently, Patrick Sims-Williams notes that the two names cannot refer to the same individual due to differences in their etymologies, adding that dating the stone to the time of Vortiporius may not be valid because it relies on the inexact dating of manuscripts and their transcriptions.

Geoffrey of Monmouth
Geoffrey's mention of Vortiporius is contained in a brief chapter titled "Uortiporius, being declared king, conquers the Saxons". He says that Uortiporius succeeded Aurelius Conan, and after he was declared king, the Saxons rose against him and brought over their countrymen from Germany in a great fleet, but that these were defeated. Uortiporius then ruled peacefully for four years, beings succeeded by "Malgo" (Maelgwn Gwynedd). Geoffrey's fertile imagination is the only source of this information.

The Myvyrian Archaiology of Wales, an early 19th-century collection of Welsh histories, repeats Geoffrey's account, referring to him as 'Gwrthevyr' (though Vortiporius' proper Modern Welsh spelling is Gwrdebyr; here the name has been confused with that of Vortimer, the son of Vortigern). In his Britannicarum Ecclesiarum Antiquitates, James Ussher also repeats the account, attributing the information to Geoffrey.

Family
Vortipor was a son of Aergol Lawhir, so a grandson of Triffyn Farfog. He had a son named Cyngar.

See also
 Vortimer, also known as Gwrthefyr in Welsh sources

Citations

References

 — English translation
 — in Latin

6th-century monarchs in Europe
Monarchs of Dyfed
6th-century Irish people